Naglalayag (Silent Passage) is a 2004 Filipino movie that tells the story of a May–December affair between a middle-aged judge and a young taxi driver.

Synopsis
Dorinda (Nora Aunor), a state prosecutor turned judge on the edge of a mid-life crisis, finds herself completely alone. Her only son Dennis resides in the United States with his wife. She has been a widow for years but lonely she isn't, she'd always tell everyone. Truth is, she lives an empty life.

Some twist of fate has her meeting Noah (Yul Servo), a young taxi driver who is poles apart from her own social and economic backgrounds. They guy is in mourning after his father, also a cabbie, died in the hands of a hold-up gang.

Dorinda is a judge and menopausal. Noah is a taxi driver and a virile 20-year-old. They don't fit the equation. But, this what makes their relationship interesting, if not exciting.

Cast
Nora Aunor as Judge Dorinda Cortez Vda. De Roces
Yul Servo as Noah Garcia
Jacklyn Jose as Lorena Garcia
Celia Rodriguez as Mrs. Roces
Aleck Bovick as Rica
Irma Adlawan as Charie
Chanda Romero as Maita
Pen Medina as Pacio Garcia
Boy Abunda as himself

Awards and recognitions

International awards

Domestic awards

References

External links

Philippine drama films
Films directed by Maryo J. de los Reyes